Adam Watts may refer to:

 Adam Watts (footballer) (born 1988), English footballer
 Adam Watts (musician) (born 1975), American musician, songwriter and producer

See also
 Adam Watt (born 1967), Australian boxer and kickboxer